Maddad Khan Tanoli was the younger brother of Mir Painda Khan. He played a considerable part in fighting the Sikh Empire with his brother Painda Khan. His brother Painda Khan gifted him land as Jagirdar.

His one of descendant Atta Muhammad Khan Tanoli who was the grandson of Abdullah Khan Tanoli make a princely state as the name of Phulra in 1919. One of his grandson Safiullah khan Tanoli who was the son of Hussain Khan Tanoli played a ministry role in Amb state as with Nawab Khan zaman Khan Tanoli and then his successor Muhammad Farid Khan Tanoli.

References

Hindkowan people
1819 births
1888 deaths